Brian Wang (born ) is an American wushu taolu athlete.

Career 
Wang started training wushu at the age of five in Illinois, and later trained in New York and California. In 2013, he became a member of the US Wushu Team and became a four-time medalist at the Pan American Wushu Championships. He made his international debut at the 2017 World Wushu Championships in Kazan, Russia, and with his high placements at the 2019 World Wushu Championships in Shanghai, China, he qualified for the 2020 Taolu World Cup in Tokyo, Japan. Three years later at the 2022 World Games in Birmingham, he won the gold medal in men's jianshu and qiangshu combined.

Competitive history

References

External links 

 Brian Wang on Instagram

1988 births
Living people
American wushu practitioners
World Games gold medalists
World Games medalists in wushu
Competitors at the 2022 World Games
University of Illinois Urbana-Champaign alumni
Columbia University alumni
Sportspeople from Naperville, Illinois